is an inhabited island located in northeastern Ehime Prefecture, Japan, in the Seto Inland Sea between Shikoku and Honshu. The island is part of the Geiyo Islands archipelago, and is administratively the seat of the town of Kamijima, Ehime.

Geography
The island is mostly hilly, with its highest point at 210 meters above sea level. Much of the island consists of limestone.

History
Yugeshima has been inhabited since prehistoric times, and the Kushiyama Kofun is a burial mound dating from the Kofun period. Around the end of the Heian period, the island was the center of a shōen landed estate (Yuge Island Shōen ruins)controlled by retired Emperor Go-Shirakawa and was noted for its production of salt. The estate later became property of the temple of [[[Tō-ji]] in Kyoto and its detailed records from the Kamakura period are regarded as a valuable historic resource. The island became part of Yuge Village in Ehime Prefecture, with the establishment of the modern municipalities system on December 15, 1889. It became the town of Yuge in 1953. The town merged with neighboring villages to become the town of Kamijima on September 30, 2004 . The primary occupations on the island are centered on commercial fishing.

External links

Kamijima Chamber of Commerce

Islands of Ehime Prefecture
Geiyo Islands